Tsai Chi-huang (born 29 September 1968) is a Taiwanese professional golfer.

Tsai has won several events in Taiwan and China, including the 2002 and 2012 Mercuries Taiwan Masters, and the 1997 Taiwan Open

Professional wins (4)

Asian Tour wins (2)

Other wins (2)
1997 Taiwan Open
2008 Luxehills Chengdu Open (Omega China Tour)

Team appearances
Amateur
Eisenhower Trophy (representing Taiwan): 1990

Professional
World Cup (representing Taiwan): 1999

References

External links

Taiwanese male golfers
Asian Tour golfers
1968 births
Living people